Commander Jacob "Jack" Bursey (1903–1980) was a polar explorer, U.S. Coast Guard officer and a lecturer.

Biography

Early years
Bursey was born in 1903 in a small village called St. Lunaire in Newfoundland.  He grew up fishing on the Grand Banks from his father's schooner, driving dog teams across the frozen land and bay, and skinning seals for food and clothing. He had two brothers and three sisters. His family members worked six days a week, gardening in the rocky soil and fishing in the summer, and mending nets, dogsledding, and catching seals in the winter. Bursey's family was a little better off than many of his cousins, aunts, and uncles because of their schooner and their family-owned store where the other residents traded. They also bought and sold all the fish in the village. 

With assistance from a doctor in St. Anthony, a neighboring community, Bursey left home at 21 and enrolled at a Boston institute in the United States.

First Byrd expedition

In 1927 Bursey read in a newspaper that Commander Richard E. Byrd was planning an expedition to the Antarctic and needed dog drivers and skiers. Bursey was one of 50,000 American males to apply.

While Bursey was not initially selected, he brought a letter of recommendation from his employer to the expedition office and appealed to one of Byrd's men. The departure was scheduled in less than two weeks.

In two days Bursey was granted an interview with Byrd. "I was disappointed when I first saw Commander Byrd," he recalled in an interview in 1979 in the Grand Rapids Press.  "I had pictured him as a 7-foot giant with fire in his eyes. Instead, he was a slight man. Looking at me from across the desk, he seemed humble and friendly. It was probably the shortest interview on record."

Byrd then told him that all his men were hired, but that he would see what he could do.

Luck and experience were with Bursey. He was signed on as a seaman on the barque the SS City of New York, one of two ships Byrd was taking on the expedition to the Bay of Whales, Antarctica. The City of New York, a sailing vessel, was probably one of the last of her kind in the world. Roald Amundsen, as a young man, had sailed on her during one of her first voyages.

Byrd's other ship was the Eleanor Bolling, a steam vessel. On it were the parts of the plane the Floyd Bennett which, when assembled, was to carry Byrd over the pole.

Bursey was on the barque when it left New York August 25, traveling through the Panama Canal and across the Pacific Ocean, reaching New Zealand in 91 days. The Bolling, a faster ship, had left a month later.

With the Antarctic spring approaching, the two ships left New Zealand December 2 on the final  lap to the frozen continent. The Bolling took the City of New York in tow to save coal. 

According to Bursey, a whaler, the C. A. Larsen, which worked the area every summer, met the City of New York and towed it through the pack ice while the Bolling returned to New Zealand for more supplies.

 On Christmas Day the Great Ice Barrier was sighted, and two days later, the City of New York was tied to ice in the Bay of Whales. Each day the dog teams hauled the supplies to camp. After the Bolling arrived from New Zealand with more cargo, the bay ice became unsafe and the two ships tied up to the towering ice barrier. On one trip to camp with supplies, Bursey heard the ships' whistles blowing in alarm. The ice barrier had suddenly cracked, plunging tons of ice on the decks, partly capsizing the Bolling and throwing one man in the water.

"This all but ended the expedition right there," he remembered. "The success of this million-dollar expedition depended on the polar flight. The fuselage of the Ford plane had been landed on top of the barrier, but the wings were on large pieces of ice floating by the ships. Through the quick action of the crew, everything was rescued."  The men worked hard in the weeks ahead and before the sun went down and the long winter night set in, the camp was ready. In his diary Bursey wrote, "The temperature has dropped to 172 degrees below, our record for the year so far."

Finally on August 20, 1929, he wrote: "Today is the day of the beautiful morning ... we saw the sun for the first time since April 19."

Bursey and several others traveled into the heartland by dog team on two missions. One was to mark a safe trail and leave caches of supplies over the 200 miles of treacherous crevasses and open chasms between the main base and the Queen Maud mountain range where the geological party would make camp and conduct their studies. The other was to provide ground support for Byrd by erecting beacons every 50 miles and depositing emergency supplies at them in case Byrd’s plane crashed when he attempted to fly over the pole. Bursey's lead dog, St. Lunaire, blazed the trail. Byrd sent them off with: "Boys I would rather never fly over the South Pole than to lose one of you. Always take the course of safety; your lives are precious to me."

They reached the South Pole on November 29, 1929. Bursey described it: 

But the danger was not yet over. Early in 1930, the City of New York was to return to the Antarctic to bring home the 42 men who had wintered at Little America. It was the worst spring ice in memory and the whaling vessels that usually went through the pack in December were unable to get through without damage. Into this mass of roaring ice the gallant City of New York hurled herself, forcing a way through. But there came the day when the ship labored, groaning under 200 tons of ice, the deck nearly awash. It was decided that if the Great Ice Barrier were not sighted in a few hours, the ship must turn north or sink. It was not unlike the possibility of trying to reach the moon in later years if the astronauts had had to be rescued. If the ship could not make it, there was no way to rescue these men until the ice thawed. There would be no long range aircraft manufactured for many years.

According to Russell Owen, a special correspondent for the New York Times who was on board, "As the men were ready to drop from weariness, the clouds opened and ahead of them was the magnificent peak of Mount Erebus, the living volcano of the Antarctic."

When the men returned to New York, they were greeted by Mayor Jimmy Walker, who led them on a ticker tape parade. Bursey and his mates each received a medal, authorized by a special act of Congress.  It is inscribed: "Presented to the officers and men of the Byrd Antarctic Expedition l [for] their heroic and undaunted service in connection with scientific investigations and extraordinary aerial exploration of the Antarctic Continent."

Bursey missed Byrd's second Antarctic expedition in the early 1930s. While conducting tours of the City of New York at the Chicago World's Fair, he met and subsequently married Ada DeGraff from Grand Rapids, Michigan, one of the first women to fly in west Michigan. They had one daughter, Gloria.

The SS City of New York sank on a rocky shoal at Yarmouth, Nova Scotia, in 1962.

Third Byrd expedition
Jack Bursey went on to accompany Byrd on his third Antarctic expedition in 1939–41, during which he and two other men made one of the longest dog-team trips ever recorded. Today there are mountains in the Hal Flood Range named after them: Mount Bursey, Mount Moulton and Mount Berlin. Once again, each of the men on the expedition received a special Congressional medal.

During World War II, he joined the U.S. Coast Guard and was captain of a freight and supply ship in the Philippines. In 1955, by then a lieutenant commander, Bursey was assigned to Operation Deep Freeze for the International Geophysical Year.  On this expedition he led a party of Seabees a distance of  toward Byrd Station at latitude 80 degrees south, traveling in two vehicle-type Sno-Cats and one tractor-type Weasel. But for the first time the deadly crevasses defeated Bursey and his party. Unable to get through, he was ordered back to the base. On the way home in 1957, Bursey received word that Admiral Byrd had died.

Other activities
Between the later expeditions and for years afterward, Bursey lectured across the U.S. and at schools, often showing original 16mm films taken during the expeditions.

Jack Bursey is the author of two books:
Antarctic Night (Chicago: Rand McNally, 1957)
St Lunaire, Antarctic Lead Dog (Glory Publishing Co, 1974)

References

 Quotes and material used in this article were provided by Jack Bursey's daughter, Gloria, who interviewed him for articles, including one in the Grand Rapids Press. 

1903 births
1978 deaths
People from Newfoundland (island)
People from Montague, Michigan
Canadian explorers
United States Coast Guard personnel of World War II
Explorers of Antarctica
Canadian memoirists
20th-century memoirists